Qaleh-ye Piru (also Romanized as Qal‘eh-ye Pīrū and Qal‘eh Pīrū) is a village in Bakesh-e Yek Rural District, in the Central District of Mamasani County, Fars Province, Iran. At the 2006 census, its population was 639, in 134 families.

References 

Populated places in Mamasani County